In the 2001–02 season, USM Alger is competing in the Super Division for the 22nd time, as well as the Algerian Cup.  It is their 7th consecutive season in the top flight of Algerian football. They will be competing in Ligue 1, the African Cup Winners' Cup and the Algerian Cup.

Squad list
Players and squad numbers last updated on 1 September 2001.Note: Flags indicate national team as has been defined under FIFA eligibility rules. Players may hold more than one non-FIFA nationality.

Pre-season and friendlies

Competitions

Overview

Super Division

League table

Results summary

Results by round

Matches

Algerian Cup

African Cup Winners' Cup

First round

Second round

Squad information

Appearances and goals

|-

Goalscorers
Includes all competitive matches. The list is sorted alphabetically by surname when total goals are equal.

Clean sheets
Includes all competitive matches.

Transfers

In

Out

References

External links
 2001–02 USM Alger season at soccerbot 

USM Alger seasons
USM Alger